Oktōēchos (here transcribed "Octoechos";; from ὀκτώ "eight" and ἦχος "sound, mode" called echos; Slavonic: Осмогласие, Osmoglasie from о́смь "eight" and гласъ "voice, sound") is the name of the eight mode system used for the composition of religious chant in Byzantine, Syriac, Armenian, Georgian, Latin and Slavic churches since the Middle Ages. In a modified form the octoechos is still regarded as the foundation of the tradition of monodic Orthodox chant today.

From a Phanariot point of view, the re-formulation of the Octoechos and its melodic models according to the New Method was neither a simplification of the Byzantine tradition nor an adaption to Western tonality and its method of an heptaphonic solfeggio, just based on one tone system (σύστημα κατὰ ἑπταφωνίαν). Quite the opposite, as a universal approach to music traditions of the Mediterranean it was rather based on the integrative power of the psaltic art and the Papadike, which can be traced back to the Hagiopolitan Octoechos and its exchange with Oriental music traditions since more than thousand years.

Hence, the current article is divided into three parts. The first is a discussion of the current solfeggio method based on seven syllables in combination with the invention of a universal notation system which transcribed the melos in the very detail (Chrysanthos' Theoretikon mega). The second and third part are based on a theoretical separation between the exoteric and the esoteric use of modern or Neobyzantine notation. Exoteric (ἐξωτερική = "External") music meant the transcription of patriotic songs, opera arias, traditional music of the Mediterrean including Ottoman makam and Persian music, while esoteric (ἐσωτερική = "internal") pointed at the papadic tradition of using Round notation with the modal signatures of the eight modes, now interpreted as a simple pitch key without implying any cadential patterns of a certain echos. In practice there had never been such a rigid separation between exoteric and esoteric among Romaic musicians, certain exchanges—with makam traditions in particular—were rather essential for the redefinition of Byzantine Chant, at least according to the traditional chant books published as "internal music" by the teachers of the New Music School of the Patriarchate.

Transcribing theseis of the melos and makam music
Unlike Western tonality and music theory the universal theory of the Phanariotes does not distinguish between major and minor scales, even if they transcribed Western polyphony into Byzantine neumes, and in fact, the majority of the models of the Byzantine Octoechos, as they are performed in Mediterranean churches by traditional singers, would lose their proper intonation and expression, if they were played on a conventionally tuned piano. Exactly the familiarity with microtonal intervals was an advantage, which made the Chrysanthine or Neobyzantine notation as a medium of transmission more universal than any Western notation system. Among others even Western staff notation and Eastern neume notation had been used for transcriptions of Ottoman classical music, despite their specific traditional background.

The transcription into the reform notation and its distribution by the first printed chant books were another aspect of the Phanariotes' universality. The first source to study the development of modern Byzantine notation and its translation of Papadic Notation is Chrysanthos' "Long Treatise of Music Theory". In 1821 only a small extract had been published as a manual for his reform notation, the Θεωρητικόν μέγα was printed later in 1832. Like the Papadic method, Chrysanthos described first the basic elements, the phthongoi, their intervals according to the genus, and how to memorise them by a certain solfeggio called "parallage." The thesis of the melos was part of the singers' performance and it included also the use of rhythm.

Chrysanthos' parallagai of the three genera (γένη)

In the early Hagiopolitan Octoechos (6th-13th century) the diatonic echoi were destroyed by two phthorai nenano and nana, which were like two additional modes with their own melos, but subordinated to certain diatonic echoi. In the period of psaltic art (13th-17th century), changes between the diatonic, the chromatic, and the enharmonic genus became so popular in certain chant genres, that certain diatonic echoi of the Papadic Octoechos were coloured by the phthorai—not only by the traditional Hagiopolitan phthorai, but also by additional phthorai, which introduced transition models assimilated to certain makam intervals.

In his Mega Theoretikon (vol. 1, book 3), Chrysanthos did not only discuss the difference to European concepts of the diatonic genus, but also the other genera (chromatic and enharmonic), which had been refused in the treatises of Western music theory. He included Papadic forms of parallagai, as they had been described in the article Papadic Octoechos, Western solfeggio as well as another solfeggio taken from Ancient Greek harmonics. The differences between the diatonic, the chromatic, and enharmonic genus (gr. γένος) were defined by the use of microtones—more precisely by the question, whether intervals were either narrower or wider than the proportion of the Latin "semitonium," once defined by Eratosthenes. His points of reference were the equally tempered and to the just intonation, as it had been used since the Renaissance period, and the Pythagorean intonation, as it has been used in the diatonic genus of the Carolingian Octoechos since the Middle Ages.

Parallage of the diatonic genus
Chrysanthos had already introduced his readers to the diatonic genus and its phthongoi in the 5th chapter of the first book, called "About the parallage of the diatonic genus" (Περὶ Παραλλαγῆς τοῦ Διατονικοῦ Γένους). In the 8th chapter he demonstrates, how the intervals can be found on the keyboard of the tambur.

Hence, the phthongoi of the diatonic genus had been defined according to the proportions, as they were later called the "soft chroa of the diatonic genus" (τὸ γένος μαλακὸν διατονικὸν). For Chrysanthos this was the only diatonic genus, as far as it had been used since the early church musicians, who memorised the phthongoi by the intonation formulas (enechemata) of the Papadic Octoechos. In fact, he did not use the historical intonations, he rather translated them in the Koukouzelian wheel in the 9th chapter (Περὶ τοῦ Τροχοῦ) according to a current practice of parallage, which was common to 18th-century versions of Papadike, while he identified another chroa of the diatonic genus with a practice of ancient Greeks:

Τὸ δὲ Πεντάχορδον, τὸ ὁποῖον λέγεται καὶ Τροχὸς, περιέχει διαστήματα τέσσαρα, τὰ ὁποῖα καθ᾽ ἡμᾶς μὲν εἶναι τόνοι· κατὰ δὲ τοὺς ἀρχαίους ἕλληνας, τὰ μὲν τρία ἦσαν τόνοι· καὶ τὸ ἕν λεῖμμα. Περιορίζονται δὲ τὰ τέσσαρα διαστήματα ταῦτα ἀπὸ φθόγγους πέντε.

πα βου γα δι Πα, καθ᾽ ἡμᾶς·

κατὰ δὲ τοὺς ἀρχαίους τε τα τη τω Τε.

The pentachord which was also called wheel (τροχὸς), contains four intervals which we regard as certain tones [ἐλάσσων τόνος, ἐλάχιστος τόνος, and 2 μείζονες τόνοι], but according to the ancient Greeks they had been three whole tones [3 μείζονες τόνοι] and the difference leimma [256:243]. The four intervals spanned five phthongoi:

πα βου γα δι Πα ["Πα" means here the fifth-equivalent for the protos: α'] for us,

but according to the ancient (Greeks) τε τα τη τω Τε.

In Chrysanthos' version of the wheel the Middle Byzantine modal signatures had been replaced by alternative signatures which were still recognised by enechemata of the former parallage, and these signatures were important, because they formed a part of the modal signatures used in Chrysanthos reform notation.

In the table at the end of the trochos chapter, it becomes evident, that Chrysanthos was quite aware of the discrepancies between his adaption to the Ottoman tambur frets which he called diapason (σύστημα κατὰ ἑπταφωνίαν), and the former Papadic parallage according to the trochos system (σύστημα κατὰ τετραφωνίαν), which was still recognised as the older practice. And later in the fifth book he emphasised that the great harmony of Greek music comes by the use of four tone systems (diphonia, triphonia, tetraphonia, and heptaphonia), while European and Ottoman musicians used only the heptaphonia or diapason system:

Ἀπὸ αὐτὰς λοιπὸν ἡ μὲν διαπασῶν εἶναι ἡ ἐντελεστέρα, καὶ εἰς τὰς ἀκοὰς εὐαρεστοτέρα· διὰ τοῦτο καὶ τὸ Διαπασῶν σύστημα προτιμᾶται, καὶ μόνον εἶναι εἰς χρῆσιν παρὰ τοῖς Μουσικοῖς Εὐρωπαίοις τε καὶ Ὀθωμανοῖς· οἵ τινες κατὰ τοῦτο μόνον τονίζοθσι τὰ Μουσικά τῶν ὄργανα.
But among those, the diapason is the most perfect and it pleases more the ears than the others, hence, the diapason system is favored and the only one used by European and Ottoman musicians, so that they tune their instruments only according to this system.

Until the generation of traditional protopsaltes who died during the 1980s, there were still traditional singers who intoned the Octoechos according to the trochos system (columns 3–6), but they did not intone the  according to Pythagorean tuning, as Chrysanthos imagined it as a practice of the Ancient Greeks and identified it as a common European practice (first column in comparison with Western solfeggio in the second column).

In the last column of his table, he listed the new modal signatures or matyriai of the phthongoi (μαρτυρίαι "witnesses"), as he introduced them for the use of his reform notation as a kind of pitch class system. These marytyriai had been composed by a thetic and a dynamic sign. The thetic was the first letter of Chrysanthos monosyllable parallage, the dynamic was taken from 5 signs of the eight enechemata of the trochos. The four of the descending enechemata (πλ α', πλ β', υαρ, and πλ δ'), and the phthora nana (γ'). Thus, it was still possible to refer to the tetraphonia of the trochos system within the heptaphonia of Chrysanthos' parallage, but there was one exception: usually the νανὰ represented the tritos element, while the varys-sign (the ligature for υαρ) represented the ζω (b natural)—the plagios tritos which could no longer establish a pentachord to its kyrios (like in the old system represented by Western solfeggio between B fa and F ut'), because it had been diminished to a slightly augmented tritone.

The older polysyllable parallage of the trochos was represented between the third and the sixth column. The third column used the "old" modal signatures for the ascending kyrioi echoi according to Chrysanthos' annotation of the trochos, as they became the main signatures of the reform notation. The fourth column listed the names of their enechemata, the fifth column the names of the enechemata of the descending  together with their signatures in the sixth column.

In the 5th chapter "about the parallage of the diatonic genus", he characterised both parallagai, of the Papadike and of the New Method, as follows:

§. 43. Παραλλαγὴ εἶναι, τὸ νὰ ἑφαρμόζωμεν τὰς συλλαβὰς τῶν φθόγγων ἐπάνω εἰς τοὺς ἐγκεχαραγμένους χαρακτῆρας, ὥστε βλέποντες τοὺς συντεθειμένους χαρακτῆρας, νὰ ψάλλωμεν τοὺς φθόγγους· ἔνθα ὅσον οἱ πολυσύλλαβοι φθόγγοι ἀπομακρύνονται τοῦ μέλους, ἄλλο τόσον οἱ μονοσύλλαβοι ἐγγίζουσιν ἀυτοῦ. Διότι ὅταν μάθῃ τινὰς νὰ προφέρῃ παραλλακτικῶς τὸ μουσικὸν πόνημα ὀρθῶς, ἀρκεῖ ἠ ἀλλάξῃ τὰς συλλαβὰς τῶν φθόγγων, λέγων τὰς συλλαβὰς τῶν λέξεων, καὶ ψάλλει αὐτὸ κατὰ μέλος.
Parallage is to apply the syllables of the phthongoi according to the steps indicated by the phonic neumes, so that we sing the phthongoi while we look at the written neumes. Note, that the more the polysyllabic phthongoi lead away from the melos [because the thesis of the melos has still to be done], the more go the monosyllable phthongoi with the melos. Once a musical composition has been studied thoroughly by the use of parallage, it is enough to replace the syllables of the phthongoi by those of the text, and thus, we sing already its melos.

The disadvantage of the Papadic or "polysyllabic parallage" was, that metrophonia (its application to the phonic neumes of a musical composition) led away from the melodic structure, because of the own gesture of each modal intonation (enechema), which already represents an echos and its models in itself. After the phonic neumes had been recognised by μετροφωνία, the appropriate method to do the thesis of the melos had to be chosen, before a reader could find the way to the composition's performance. This was no longer necessary with monosyllabic solfeggio or parallage, because the thesis of the melos had been already transcribed into phonic neumes—the musician had finally become as ignorant as Manuel Chrysaphes had already feared it during the 15th century.

Nevertheless, the diapason system (see table) had also changed the former tetraphonic disposition of the echoi according to the trochos system, which organised the final notes of each kyrios-plagios pair in a pentachord which had always been a pure fifth.

The difference between the diapason and the trochos system corresponded somehow with the oral melos transmission of the 18th century, documented by the manuscripts and the printed editions of the "New Music School of the Patriarchate", and the written transmission of the 14th-century chant manuscripts (revised heirmologia, sticheraria, Akolouthiai, and Kontakaria) which fit rather to the Octoechos disposition of the trochos system. Chrysanthos' theory aimed to bridge these discrepancies and the "exegetic transcription" or translation of late Byzantine notation into his notation system. This way the "exegesis" had become an important tool to justify the innovations of the 18th century within the background of the Papadic tradition of psaltic art.

Parallagai of the chromatic genus

 
It found its most odd definition in Chrysanthos' Mega Theoretikon, because he diminished the whole octave about 4 divisions in order to describe  as a mode which has developed its own diphonic tone system (7+12=19). Indeed, its parallage is indefinite and in this particular case the  has no direction, instead the direction is defined by the diatonic intonations of :
§. 244. Ἡ χρωματικὴ κλίμαξ νη [πα ὕφεσις] βου γα δι [κε ὕφεσις] ζω Νη σχηματίζει ὄχι τετράχορδα, ἀλλὰ τρίχορδα πάντῃ ὅμοια καὶ συνημμένα τοῦτον τὸν τρόπον·

νη [πα ὕφεσις] βου, βου γα δι, δι [κε ὕφεσις] ζω, ζω νη Πα.

Αὕτη ἡ κλίμαξ ἀρχομένη ἀπὸ τοῦ δι, εἰμὲν πρόεισιν ἐπὶ τὸ βαρὺ, θέλει τὸ μὲν δι γα διάστημα τόνον μείζονα· τὸ δὲ γα βου τόνον ἐλάχιστον· τὸ δὲ βου πα, τόνον μείζονα· καὶ τὸ πα νη, τόνον ἐλάχιστον. Εἰδὲ πρόεισιν ἐπὶ τὸ ὀξὺ, θέλει τὸ μὲν δι κε διάστημα τόνον ἐλάχιστον· τὸ δὲ κε ζω, τόνον μείζονα· τὸ δὲ ζω νη, τόνον ἐλάχιστον· καὶ τὸ νη Πα, τόνον μείζονα. Ὥστε ταύτης τῆς χρωματικῆς κλίμακος μόνον οἱ βου γα δι φθόγγοι ταὐτίζονται μὲ τοὺς βου γα δι φθόγγους τῆς διατονικῆς κλίμακος· οἱ δὲ λοιποὶ κινοῦνται. Διότι τὸ βου νη διάστημα κατὰ ταύτην μὲν τὴν κλίμακα περιέχει τόνους μείζονα καὶ ἐλάχιστον· κατὰ δὲ τὴν διατονικὴν κλίμακα περιέχει τόνους ἐλάσσονα καὶ μείζονα· ὁμοίως καὶ τὸ δι ζω διάστημα.
The chromatic scale C νη—[D flat]—E βου—F γα—G δι—[a flat]—b ζω'—c νη' is not made of tetrachords, but of trichords which are absolutely equal and conjunct with each other—in this way:

C νη—[D flat]—E βου, E βου—F γα—G δι, G δι—[a flat]—b ζω', b ζω'—c νη'—d πα'

If the scale starts on G δι, and it moves towards the lower, the step G δι—F γα requests the interval of a great tone (μείζων τόνος) and the step F γα—E βου a small tone (ἐλάχιστος τόνος); likewise the step E βου—[D flat] πα [ὕφεσις] an interval of μείζων τόνος, and the step πα [ὕφεσις] [D flat]—C νη one of ἐλάχιστος τόνος. When the direction is towards the higher, the step G δι—[a flat] κε [ὕφεσις] requests the interval of a small tone and [a flat] κε [ὕφεσις]—b ζω' that of a great tone; likewise the step b ζω'—c νη' an interval of ἐλάχιστος τόνος, and the step c νη'—Cd πα one of μείζων τόνος. While this scale extends between E βου and C νη over one great and one small tone [12+7=19], the diatonic scale extends from the middle (ἐλάσσων τόνος) to the great tone (μείζων τόνος) [12+9=21], for the interval between G δι and b ζω' it is the same.

According to Chrysanthos, the old enechema for the diatonic  on b ζω' was preserved by traditional singers as the chromatic mesos, which he transcribed by the following exegesis. Please note the soft chromatic phthora at the beginning:

Also this example explains an important aspect of the contemporary concept of exegesis.

The hard chromatic and mixed scale of 

§. 247. Τὴν δὲ Β κλίμακα πα [βου ὕφεσις] [γα δίεσις] δι κε [ζω ὕφεσις] [νη δίεσις] Πα, μὲ τοὺς αὐτοὺς μὲν φθόγγους ψάλλομεν, καὶ ἡ μελῳδία τοῦτων μὲ τοὺς αὐτοὺς χαρακτῆρας γράφεται· ὅμως οἱ φθόγγοι φυλάττουσι τὰ διαστήματα, ἅτινα διωρίσθησαν (§. 245.).
We sing with the same  [here the same names for the notes as memorial places] the second [chromatic] scale: D πα—[high E flat]—[high F sharp]—G δι—a κε—[high b flat]—[high c sharp]—d πα', and their melody is written with the same phonic neumes. Nevertheless the phthongoi preserve the intervals as written in § 245.

Without any doubt the hard chromatic phthongoi use the chromaticism with the enharmonic hemitone of the intonation νενανῶ, so in this case the chromatic parallage gets a very clear direction, that the diphonic tone system does not have:

§. 245. Ἡ χρωματικὴ κλίμαξ, πα [βου ὕφεσις] [γα δίεσις] δι κε [ζω ὕφεσις] [νη δίεσις] Πα, σύγκειται ἀπὸ δύο τετράχορδα· ἐν ἑκατέρῳ δὲ τετραχόρδῳ κεῖνται τὰ ἡμίτονα οὕτως, ὥστε τὸ διάστημα πα βου εἶναι ἴσον μὲ τὸ κε ζω· τὸ δὲ βου γα εἶναι ἴσον μὲ τὸ ζω νη· καὶ τὸ γα δι εἶναι ἴσον μὲ τὸ νη Πα· καὶ ὅλον τὸ πα δι τετράχορδον εἶναι ἴσον μὲ τὸ κε Πα τετράχορδον. Εἶναι δὲ τὸ μὲν πα βου διάστημα ἴσον ἐλαχιστῳ τόνῳ· τὸ δὲ βου γα, τριημιτόνιον· καὶ τὸ γα δι, ἡμιτόνιον· ἤγουν ἴσον 3:12.
The chromatic scale: D πα—[high E flat]—[high F sharp]—G δι—a κε—[high b flat]—[high c sharp]—d πα', consists of two tetrachords. In each tetrachords the hemitones are placed in a way, that the interval D πα—E βου [ὕφεσις] is the same as a κε—b ζω' [ὕφεσις], Ε βου [ὕφεσις]—F sharp γα [δίεσις] is the same as b ζω' [ὕφεσις]—c sharp νη' [δίεσις], and F sharp γα [δίεσις]—G δι is the same as c sharp νη' [δίεσις]—d πα', so that both tetarchords, D πα—G δ and a κε—d πα', are unisono. This means that the interval D πα—E βου [ὕφεσις] is unisono with the small tone (ἐλάχιστος τόνος), Ε βου [ὕφεσις]—F sharp γα [δίεσις] with the trihemitone, and F sharp γα [δίεσις]—G δι with the hemitone: 3:12—a quarter of the great tone (μείζων τόνος) [7+18+3=28].

Please note the hard chromatic phthorai, the second in the text line had been taken from the papadic :

The other mixed form, though rare, was the combination of phthora nenano on the protos parallage (α' κε—δ' πα') with a diatonic protos pentachord under it (πλ α' πα—α' κε).

Enharmonic genos and triphonia of phthora nana

According to the definition of Aristides Quintilianus, quoted in the seventh chapter of the third book (περὶ τοῦ ἐναρμονίου γένους) in Chrysanthos' Mega Theoretikon, "enharmonic" is defined by the smallest interval, as long as it is not larger than a quarter or a third of the great tone (μείζων τόνος):

§. 258. Ἁρμονία δὲ λέγεται εἰς τὴν μουσικὴν τὸ γένος ὅπερ ἔχει εἰς τὴν κλίμακά του διάστημα τεταρτημορίου τοῦ μείζονος τόνου· τὸ δὲ τοιοῦτον διάστημα λέγεται ὕφεσις ἢ δίεσις ἐναρμόνιος· καθὼς καὶ δίεσις χρωματικὴ λέγεται τὸ ἥμισυ διάστημα τοῦ μείζονος τόνου. Ἐπειδὴ δὲ ὁ ἐλάχιστος τόνος, λογιζόμενος ἴσος 7, διαιρούμενος εἰς 3 καὶ 4, δίδει τεταρτημόριον καὶ τριτημόριον τοῦ μείζονος τόνου, ἡμεῖς ὅταν λάβωμεν ἓν διάστημα βου γα, ἴσον 3, εὑρίσκομεν τὴν ἐναρμόνιον δίεσιν· τὴν ὁποίαν μεταχειριζόμενοι εἰς τὴν κλίμακα, ἐκτελοῦμεν τὸ ἐναρμόνιον γένος· διότι χαρακτηρίζεται, λέγει ὁ Ἀριστείδης, τὸ ἐναρμόνιον γένος ἐκ τῶν τεταρτημοριαίων διέσεων τοῦ τόνου.
In music, the genus is called "harmony" which has the interval of a quarter great tone (μείζων τόνος) in its scale, and such an interval is called the "enharmonic" hyphesis or diesis, while the diesis with an interval about half of a great tone is called "chromatic". Since the small tone (ἐλάχιστος τόνος) is considered equal to 7 parts, the difference about 3 or 4, which makes a quarter or a third of the great tone, and the interval E βου—F γα, equal to 3, can be found through the enharmonic diesis; this applied to a scale, realizes the enharmonic genus. Aristeides said, that the enharmonic genus was characterised by the diesis about a quarter of a whole tone.

But the difference about 50 cents already made the difference between the small tone (ἐλάχιστος τόνος) and the Western semitonium (88:81=143 C', 256:243=90 C'), so it did not only already appear in the hard chromatic genos, but also in the Eastern use of dieses within the diatonic genus and in the  definition of the diatonic genus in Latin chant treatises. Hence, several manuals of Orthodox Chant mentioned that the enharmonic use of intervals had been spread over all different genera (Chrysanthos discussed these differences within the genus as "chroa"), but several Phanariotes defined this general phenomenon by the use of the word "harmony" (ἁρμονία) which was the Greek term for music and contrasted it with the modern term "music" (μουσική) which had been taken from Arabic, usually to make a difference between the reference to ancient Greek music theory and the autochthonous theory treating melody (naġām) and rhythm (īqā′at). According to the ancient Greek use, ἐναρμονίος was simply an adjective meaning "being within the music". In the discussion of the Euklidian term "chroa", he mentioned that the substitution of a semitonium by two dieses as it can be found in Western music, was "improper" (ἄτοπον) in Byzantine as well as in Ottoman art music, because it added one more element to the heptaphonic scale.

But Aristeides' definition also explained, why the enharmonic  (also called ) had been defined in later manuals as "hard diatonic". The more characteristic change was less those of the genus (μεταβολή κατὰ γένος) than the one from the tetraphonic to the triphonic tone system (μεταβολή κατὰ σύστημα):
Διὰ τοῦτο ὅταν τὸ μέλος τοῦ ἐναρμονίου γένους ἄρχηται ἀπὸ τοῦ γα, θέλει νὰ συμφωνῇ μὲ τὸν γα ἡ ζω ὕφεσις, καὶ ὄχι ὁ νη φθόγγος. Καὶ ἐκεῖνο ὅπερ εἰς τὴν διατονικὴν καὶ χρωματικὴν κλίμακα ἐγίνετο διὰ τῆς τετραφωνίας, ἐδῶ γίνεται διὰ τῆς τριφωνίας

νη πα [βου δίεσις] γα, γα δι κε [ζω ὕφεσις−6], [ζω ὕφεσις−6] νη πα [βου ὕφεσις−6].

Ὥστε συγκροτοῦνται καὶ ἐδῶ τετράχορδα συνημμένα ὅμοια, διότι ἔχουσι τὰ ἐν μέσῳ διαστήματα ἴσα· τὸ μὲν νη πα ἴσον τῷ γα δι· τὸ δὲ πα [βου δίεσις], ἴσον τῷ δι κε· τὸ δὲ [βου δίεσις] γα, ἴσον τῷ κε [ζω ὕφεσις−6]· καὶ τὰ λοιπά.
Hence, if the melos of the enharmonic genus starts on F γα, F γα and b flat [ζω' ὕφεσις−6] should be symphonous, and not the phthongos c νη'. And like the diatonic and chromatic scales are made of tetraphonia, here they are made of triphonia:

C νη—D πα—E sharp [βου δίεσις]—F γα, F γα—G δι—a κε—b flat [ζω' ὕφεσις−6], b flat [ζω' ὕφεσις−6]—c νη'—d πα'—e flat [βου' ὕφεσις−6].

Thus, also conjunct similar tetrachords are constructed by the same intervals in the middle [12+13+3=28]: C νη—D πα is equal to F γα—G δι, D πα—E sharp [βου δίεσις] to G δι—a κε, E sharp [βου δίεσις]—F γα is equal to a κε—b flat [ζω' ὕφεσις−6], etc.
As can be already seen in the Papadikai of the 17th century, the diatonic intonation of echos tritos had been represented by the modal signature of the enharmonic phthora nana. In his chapter about the intonation formulas (περὶ ἁπηχημάτων) Chrysanthos does no longer refer to the diatonic intonation of ἦχος τρίτος, instead the echos tritos is simply an exegesis of the enharmonic . Please note the use of the Chrysanthine phthora to indicate the small hemitonion in the final cadence of φθορά νανὰ in the interval γα—βου:

Smallest tones (hemitona)

Chrysanthos' concept of "half tone" (ἡμίτονον) should not be mistaken with the Latin semitonium which he called λεῖμμα (256:243), it was rather flexible, as it can be read in his chapter "about hemitonoi" (περὶ ἡμιτόνων):

Τὸ Ἡμίτονον δὲν ἐννοεῖ τὸν τόνον διηρημένον ἀκριβῶς εἰς δύο, ὡς τὰ δώδεκα εἰς ἓξ καὶ ἓξ, ἀλλ᾽ ἀορίστως· ἤγουν τὰ δώδεκα εἰς ὀκτὼ καὶ τέσσαρα, ἢ εἰς ἐννέα καὶ τρία, καὶ τὰ λοιπά. Διότι ὁ γα δι τόνος διαιρεῖται εἰς δύο διαστήματα, ἀπὸ τὰ ὁποῖα τὸ μὲν ἀπὸ τοῦ ὀξέος ἐπὶ τὸ βαρὺ εἶναι τριτημόριον· τὸ δὲ ἀπὸ τοῦ βαρέος ἐπὶ τὸ ὀξὺ, εἶναι δύο τριτημόρια, καὶ τὰ λοιπά. Εἰναι ἔτι δυνατὸν νὰ διαιρεθῃ καὶ ἀλλέως· τὸ ἡμίτονον ὃμως τοῦ βου γα τόνου καὶ τοῦ ζω νη, εἶναι τὸ μικρότατον, καὶ δὲν δέχεται διαφορετικὴν διαίρεσιν· διότι λογίζεται ὡς τεταρτημόριον τοῦ μείζονος τόνου· ἤγουν ὡς 3:12.
[...] Καὶ τὸ λεῖμμα ἐκείνων, ἢ τὸ ἡμίτονον τῶν Εὐρωπαίων σι ουτ, εἶναι μικρότερον ἀπὸ τὸν ἡμέτερον ἐλάχιστον τόνον βου γα. Διὰ τοῦτο καὶ οἱ φθόγγοι τῆς ἡμετέρας διατονικῆς κλίμακος ἔχουσιν ἀπαγγέλίαν διάφορον, τινὲς μὲν ταὐτιζόμενοι, τινὲς δὲ ὀξυνόμενοι, καὶ τινες βαρυνόμενοι.
The hemitonon is not always the exact division into two halves like 12 into 6 and 6, it is less defined like the 12 into 8 and 4, or into 9 and 3 etc. So, the tonos γα δι [γ'—δ'] is divided into two intervals: the higher one is one third, the lower two thirds etc. The latter might be divided again, while a hemitonon of the tonos βου γα and ζω νη [β'—γ'] cannot be further divided, because they are regarded as the quarter of the great tone, which is 3:12.
[...] And the leimma of those [the Ancient Greeks] like the "semitonium" si ut of the Europeans are smaller than our small tone (ἐλάχιστος τόνος) βου γα [β'—γ']. Hence, the elements (φθόγγοι) of our diatonic scale are intoned in a slightly different way, some are just the same [ut, re, fa, sol], other are higher [la, si bemol] or lower [mi, si].
Chrysanthos' definition of a Byzantine hemitonon is related with the introduction of accidental . Concerning his own theory and the influence that it had on later theory, the accidental use of  had two functions:
 the notation of melodic attraction as part of a certain melos, which became important in the further development of modern Byzantine notation, especially within the school of Simon Karas.
 the notation of modified diatonic scales which became an important tool for the transcription of other modal traditions outside the Byzantine Octoechos (the so-called "exoteric music"), for instance folk music traditions or other traditions of Ottoman art music like the transcription of certain makamlar.

The chroai and the notation of melodic attraction

About the phenomenon of temporary attraction which did not cause a change into another genus (μεταβολή κατὰ γένος), although it caused a microtonal change, he wrote in his eight chapter "about the chroai" (περὶ χροῶν):

§. 265. Ἑστῶτες μὲν φθόγγοι εἶναι ἐκεῖνοι, τῶν ὁποίων οἱ τόνοι δὲν μεταπίπτουσιν εἰς τὰς διαφορὰς τῶν γενῶν, ἀλλὰ μένουσιν ἐπὶ μιᾶς τάσεως. Κινούμενοι δὲ ἢ φερόμενοι γθόγγοι εἲναι ἐκείνοι, τῶν ὁποίων οἱ τόνοι μεταβάλλονται εἰς τὰς διαφορὰς τῶν γενῶν, καὶ δὲν μένουσιν ἐπὶ μιᾶς τάσεως· ἣ, ὃ ταὑτὸν ἐστὶν, οἱ ποτὲ μὲν ἐλάσσονα, ποτὲ δὲ μείζονα δηλοῦντες τὰ διαστήματα, κατὰ τὰς διαφόρους συνθέσεις τῶν τετραχόρδων.

§. 266. Χρόα δὲ εἶναι εἰδικὴ διαίρεσις τοῦ γένους. Παρῆγον δὲ τὰς χρόας οἱ ἀρχαῖοι ἀπὸ τὴν διάφορον διαίρεσιν τῶν τετραχόρδων, ἀφήνοντες μὲν Ἑστῶτας φθόγγους τοῦς ἄκρους τοῦ τετραχόρδου· ποιοῦντες δὲ Κινουμένους τοὺς ἐν μέσῳ.
Fixed phthongoi called "ἑστῶτες", because they remain unaltered by the different genera, are always defined by one proportion [length of the chord]. Mobile phthongoi called "κινούμενοι", because they are altered by the different genera, are not defined by just one proportion; in other words, concerning the different divisions of the tetrachord their intervals are sometimes middle [tones], sometimes large ones.
"Chroa" is a particular division within a certain genus. The ancient [Greeks] made the "chroai" through the different divisions of the tetrachord by leaving the external phthongoi fixed (ἑστῶτες) and by moving the ones called "κινούμενοι".

As a reference for the ancient Greeks, Chrysanthos offer some examples of tetrachord divisions taken from Euklid which creates subdivisions within the same genus. The accidental use of  became later, in 1883, a subject of a synod, obviously the oral transmission of melodic attraction which differed between various local traditions, had been declined, after the abundant use of accidental  in different printed editions had confused it.

Besides, the introduction of the accidental phthora did not change the notation very much. They were perceived by performers as an interpretation without any obligation to follow, because there were various local traditions which were used to an alternative use of melodic attraction in the different melodic models used within a certain echos.

Only recently, during the 1990s, the reintroduction of abandoned late Byzantine neumes, re-interpreted into the context of the rhythmic Chrysanthine notation, had been also combined by a systematic notation of melodic attraction (μελωδικές ἕλξεις). This innovation had been already proposed by the Phanariot Simon Karas, but it was his student Lykourgos Angelopoulos who used this dieseis and hypheseis in a systematic way to transcribe a certain local tradition of melodic attraction. But it was somehow the result of distinctions between the intervals used by Western and Byzantine traditions, which finally tempted the details of the notation used by Karas' school.

Transcription of makamlar

In the last chapter of his third book "Plenty possible chroai" (Πόσαι αἱ δυναταὶ Χρόαι), Chrysanthos used with the adjective δυνατή a term which was connected with the Aristotelian philosophy of δύναμις (translated into Latin as "contingentia"), i.e. the potential of being outside the cause (ἐνέργεια) of the Octoechos, something has been modified there and it becomes something completely different within the context of another tradition.

This is Chrysanthos' systematic lists of modifications (the bold syllable had been modified by a phthora—hyphesis or diesis).

The first list is concerned about just one modification (-/+ 3):

It can be observed that the unmodified diatonic scale already corresponded to certain makamlar, for instance ἦχος λέγετος (based on the ison E βου) corresponded to makam segâh. Concerning the genus, chromatic tetrachords can be found in the makamlar hicâz, sabâ, and hüzzâm.

A second list of scales gives 8 examples out of 60 possible chroai which contain 2 modifications, usually in the same direction (the bold syllable had been modified by 2 phthorai—hypheseis or dieseis about -/+ 3 divisions, if not indicated alternatively):

A third list gives "4 examples out of 160 possible " which have 3 modifications with respect to the diatonic scale:

Chrysanthos' approach had been only systematic with respect to the modification of the diatonic scale, but not with respect to the makamlar and its models (seyirler), as they had been collected by Panagiotes Halaçoğlu and his student Kyrillos Marmarinos who already transcribed into late Byzantine Round notation in their manuscripts. A systematic convention concerning exoteric phthorai, how these models have to be transcribed according to the New Method, became the later subject of the treatises by Ioannis Keïvelis (1856) and by Panagiotes Keltzanides (1881).

Hence, the author of the Mega Theoretikon mode no efforts to offer a complete list of makamlar. Nevertheless, the central treatise of the New Method already testified, that the reform notation as a medium of transcription had been designed as a universal notation, which could be used as well to transcribe other genres of Ottoman music than just Orthodox Chant as the Byzantine heritage.

Chrysanthos' theory of rhythm and of the octoechos
The question of rhythm is the most controversial and most difficult one and an important part of the Octoechos, because the method of how to do the thesis of the melos included not only melodic features like opening, transitional, or cadential formulas, but also their rhythmic structure.

On the other hand, the New Method redefined the different genres according psalmody and according to the traditional chant books like Octoechos mega, now Anastasimatarion neon, Heirmologion, Sticherarion, and the Papadike—the treatise which preceded since the 17th century an Anthology which included a collection Polyeleos compositions, chant sung during the Divine Liturgy (Trisagia, Allelouiaria, Cherouvika, Koinonika), but also a Heirmologion kalophonikon. According to the New Method, every genre was defined now by the tempo and its formulaic repertory with respect to the echos, which formed a certain "exegesis type".

Hence, it is not a surprise that Chrysanthos in his Theoretikon mega treats rhythm and meter in the second book together with the discussion of the great signs or hypostaseis (περὶ ὑποστάσεων). The controversial discussion of the "syntomon style" as it had been created by Petros Peloponnesios and his student Petros Byzantios, was about rhythm, but the later rhythmic system of the New Method which had been created two generations later, had provoked a principle refuse of Chrysanthine notation among some traditionalists.

The new analytic use of Round notation established a direct relation of performance and rhythmic signs, which had already been a tabu since the 15th century, while the change of tempo was probably not an invention of the 19th century. At least since the 13th century, melismatic chant of the cathedral rite had been notated with abbreviations or ligatures (ἀργόν "slow") which presumably indicated a change to a slower tempo. Other discussions were about the quality of rhythm itself, if certain genres and its text had to be performed in a rhythmic or arhythmic way. In particular the knowledge of the most traditional and simple method had been lost.

Mediating between tradition and innovation, Chrysanthos had the characteristic Phanariot creativity. While he was writing about the metric feet (πώδαι) as rhythmic patterns or periods, mainly based on Aristides Quintilianus and Aristoxenos, he treated the arseis and theseis simultaneously with the Ottoman timbres düm and tek of the usulümler, and concluded, that only a very experienced musician can know, which are the rhythmic patterns that can be applied to a certain thesis of the melos. He analysed for instance the rhythmic periods as he transcribed them from Petros Peloponnesios' Heirmologion argon.

Especially concerning the ethic aspect of music, melody as well as rhythm, Chrysanthos combined knowledge about ancient Greek music theory with his experience of the use of makamlar and usulümler in the ceremony of whirling dervishes. There was a collective ethos of rhythm, because the ceremony and its composition (ayinler) followed a strict sequence of usulümler, which varied rarely and only slightly. There was a rather individual ethic concept for the combination of makamlar (tarqib), which was connected with the individual constitution of the psyche and with the inspiration of an individual musician on the other side.

In the fifth book (chapt. 3: τωρινὸς τρόπος τοῦ μελίζειν "the contemporary way of chant", pp. 181-192), he also wrote about a certain effect on the auditory that a well-educated musician is capable to create, and about contemporary types of musicians with different levels of education (the empiric, the artistic, and the experienced type). They are worth to be studied, because the role of notation in transmission becomes evident in Chrysanthos' description of the psaltes' competences. The empiric type did not know notation at all, but they knew the heirmologic melos by heart, so that they could apply it to any text, but sometimes they were sure if they repeated, what they wished repeat. So what they sang, could be written down by the artistic type, if the latter thought that the empiric psaltis was good enough. The latter case showed a certain competence which Chrysanthos already expected on the level of the empiric type. The artistic type could read, study, and transcribe all the four chant genres, and thus, they were able to repeat everything in a precise and identical way. This gave them the opportunity to create an idiomelon of their own, if they simply followed the syntax of a given text by the use of open (ἀτελεῖς καταλήξεις), closing (ἐντελεῖς καταλήξεις) and final cadences (τελικαὶ καταλήξεις). Hence, the artistic type could study other musicians and learn from their art, as long as they imitated them in their own individual way—especially in the papadic (kalophonic) genre. But only the latter experienced type understood the emotive effects of music well enough, so that they could invent text and music in exactly the way, as they wished to move the soul of the auditory.

As well for the eight echoi of the Octoechos (book 4) as for the use of rhythm (book 2), Chrysanthos described the effects that both could create, usually with reference to ancient Greek scientists and philosophers. Despite that Chrysanthos agreed with the Arabo-Persian concept of musicians as humours maker (mutriban) and with the dramaturgy of rhythm in a mystic context, his ethic concept of music was collective concerning the Octoechos and individual concerning rhythm, at least in theory. While the ethos of the echoi were characterised very generally (since Plato), the "three tropes of rhythm" (book 2, chapter 12) were distincted as systaltic (συσταλτικὴ, λυπηρὸς "sad"), diastaltic (διασταλτικὴ, θυμὸς "rage"), and hesychastic (ἡσυχαστικὴ, ἡσυχία "peace, silence" was connected with an Athonite mystic movement). Systaltic and diastaltic effects were created by the beginning of the rhythmical period (if it starts on an arsis or thesis) and by the use of the tempo (slow or fast). The hesychastic trope required a slow, but smooth rhythm, which used simple and rather equal time proportions. The agitating effect of the fast diastaltic trope could become enthusiastic and cheerful by the use of hemiolic rhythm.

In conclusion, Chrysanthos' theory was less academic than experimental and creative, and the tradition was rather an authorisation of the creative and open-minded experiments of the most important protagonists around the Patriarchate and the Fener district, but also with respect to patriotic and anthropological projects in the context of ethnic and national movements.

Makamlar as an echos aspect

Medieval Arabic sources describe the important impact that the Byzantine and Greek traditions of Damascus had for the development of an Arab music tradition, when the melodies (since 1400 maqamat) had been already described as naġme. Today the Greek reception of Ottoman makamlar by the transcription into Byzantine neume notation can be recognised as a process in six different stages or steps. The first were teretismata or kratemata which allowed various experiments with rhythm and melos like the integration of Persian chant. The second step was an interest for particular transitions inspired by makam compositions like Petros Bereketis' heirmoi of the early 18th century, in which he used certain makam intervals as a kind of change of the genus (μεταβολή κατὰ γένος) for refined transitions between certain echoi.  The third stage was a systematic collection of seyirler, in order to adapt the written transmission of Byzantine chant to other traditions. The fourth and most important step was a reform of the notation as the medium of written transmission, in order to adapt it to the scales and the tone system which was the common reference for all musicians of the Ottoman Empire. The fifth step was the systematic transcription of the written transmission of makamlar into modern Byzantine neumes, the Mecmuase, a form of Anthology which was used by Court and Sephardic musicians as well, but usually as text books. The sixth and last step was the composition of certain makamlar as part of the Octoechos tradition, after external music had turned into something internal. The exoteric had become esoteric.

"Stolen" music
Petros Peloponnesios (about 1735–1778), the teacher of the Second Music School of the Patriarchate, was born in Peloponnese, but already as a child, he grew up at Smyrna within its various music traditions. An Ottoman anecdote about "the thief Petros" (Hırsız Petros) testified that his capability to memorize and to write down music was so astonishing, that he was able to steal his melodies from everywhere and to make them up as an own composition which convinced the audience more than the musician, from whom he once had stolen it. His capacity as listener included, that he could understand any music according to its own tradition—this was not necessarily the Octoechos for a Greek socialised at Smyrna—, so that he was rather believed to be its original creator. Concerning the competence of notating music, he was not only well known as the inventor of an own method to transcribe music into Late Byzantine neumes. The use of notation as a medium of written transmission had never had such an important role within most of the Ottoman music traditions, but in case of "Hırsız Petros" a lot of musicians preferred to ask him for his permission, before they had published their own compositions. Until today the living tradition of monodic Orthodox chant is dominated by Petros Peloponnesios' own compositions and his reformulation of the traditional chant books heirmologion (the katavaseion melodies) and sticherarion (his Doxastarion syntomon is today distributed in most of the Menaia as they are used in several National-Orthodox traditions).

In Petros' time Panagiotes Halacoğlu and Kyrillos Marmarinos, Metropolit of Tinos, were collecting the seyirler by a transcription into Late Byzantine notation—other musicians, who had grown up with Alevide and Sufi compositions and with the makam seyirler of the Ottoman court and who knew not just Byzantine neumes, but also other notation systems of the Empire.

The next step which followed the systematic collection of seyirler was its classification and integration according to the Octoechos. The different usulümler were just transcribed under their names by the syllables "düm" and "tek" (for instance δοὺμ τεκ-κὲ τὲκ) with the number of beats or a division of one beat. The neume transcription just mentioned the makam and the usul at the beginning of the piece, and the main question was, which modal signature of the Octoechos had to be used to transcribe a certain makam and which additional phthora was needed to indicate the particular intonation by a change of genos (μεταβολή κατὰ γένος), the integrative concept since the Hagiopolites.

The makamlar of the diatonic echos varys
One important innovation of the reformed neume notation and its "New Method" of transcription was the heptaphonic solfeggio, which was not based on the Western equal temperature but on the frets of the tambur—a long-necked lute which had replaced the oud at the Ottoman court (mehterhane) by the end of the 17th century and which also took its place in the representation of the tone system. In his reformulation of the sticheraric melos Petros Peloponnesios defined most of the  echos-tritos models as enharmonic, but the diatonic varys ("grave mode") was no longer based on the tritos pentachord B flat—F according to the tetraphonic tone system ("trochos system"), it was based according to the tambur frets on an octave on B natural on a fret called "arak", so that the pentachord had been diminished to a tritone. Thus, some melodic models which were well known from Persian, Kurdish, or another music traditions of the Empire, could be integrated within .

For the printed chant books also a New Method had to be created which was concerned about the transcription of the makamlar. Several theoretical treatises followed Chrysanthos and some of them treated the New Method of transcribing exoteric music, which meant folklore of different regions of the Balkans and the Eastern Mediterranean which often used tunes far from the Byzantine Octoechos tradition, but also makamlar traditions of the Court and of Sufi lodges (tekke).

Panagiotes Keltzanides' method of exoteric music
Panagiotes Keltzanides' "Methodical Teaching of the Theory and Practice of External music" (1881) is not only one of few complete treatises which continue the theoretical reflection of Panagiotes Halaçoğlu and Kyrillos Marmarinos. It also contained a reproduction of a manuscript by Konstantinos the Protopsaltes with a representation of the tambur frets and interval calculations referred to certain makamlar and echoi.

The whole book is written about a composition of Beyzade Yangu Karaca and Çelebi Yangu, a didactic chant to memorize each makam like each great sign in the Mega Ison according to the school of John Glykys, and their composition was arranged by Konstantinos the Protopsaltes, and transcribed by Stephanos the Domestikos and Theodoros Phokaeos. Konstantinos' negative opinion concerning the reform notation had been well-known, so it was left to his students to transcribe the method of his teaching and its subjects. It became obviously the motivation for Panagiotes Keltzanides' publication, thus, he taught a systematic transcription method for all makamlar according to the New Method.

The main part of his work is the first part of the seventh chapter. The identification of a certain makam by a fret name makes the fret name to a substitute of a solmisation syllable used for the basis tone. It is evident that the whole solution is based on Chrysanthos New Method, and it is no longer compatible with the Papadike and the former solfeggio based on the trochos system. On the other hand, the former concept of Petros Bereketis to use a makam for a temporary change of the genus is still present in Keltzanides' method. Every makam can now be represented and even develop its own melos like any other echos, because the proper interval structure of a certain makam is indicated by the use of additional  which were sometimes named after a certain makam, as long as the phthora was representative for just one makam.

There are several compositions in echos varys—also from the great teachers like Gregorios the Protopsaltes—which are in fact compositions in makam sabâ, but it has no proper phthora which would clearly indicate the difference between echos varys and makam sabâ (see also Chrysanthos' method of transcription in his chroa chapter). A Greek singer from Istanbul would recognize it anyway, but it became so common that it might be regarded as an aspect of echos varys by psaltes of the living tradition. On the other hand, the intonation of makam müstear has its own characteristic  (φθορά μουσταχὰρ) which is often used in printed chant books. Though it is treated as an aspect of echos legetos, according to Keltzanides treated as an aspect of the diatonic  on fret "segah", its intonation is so unique, that it will be even recognised by an audience which is not as familiar with makam music, at least as something odd in an echos which already requires a very experienced psaltes.

In 1881 the transcription of makam compositions was nothing new, because several printed anthologies had been published by Phanariotes: Pandora and Evterpe by Theodoros Phokaeos and Chourmouzios the Archivist in 1830, Harmonia by Vlachopoulos in 1848, Kaliphonos Seiren by Panagiotes Georgiades in 1859, Apanthisma by Ioannis Keïvelis in 1856 and in 1872, and Lesvia Sappho by Nikolaos Vlahakis in 1870 in another reform notation invented in Lesbos. New was without any doubt the systematic approach to understand the whole system of makamlar as part of the Octoechos tradition.

Octoechos melopœia according to the New Method

The Byzantine echoi are currently used in the monodic hymns of the Eastern Orthodox Churches in Bulgaria, Greece, Romania, Croatia, Albania, Serbia, Macedonia, Italy, Russia, and in several Oriental Orthodox Churches of the Middle East.

According to medieval theory, the plagioi (oblique) echoi mentioned above (Hagiopolitan Octoechos) employ the same scales, the final degrees of the plagioi echoi are a fifth below with respect to the ones of the kyrioi echoi. There are typically two main notes that defined each of the Byzantine tones (ἦχοι, гласове): the base degree (basis) or ison which is sung as a typical drone with the melody by ison-singers (isokrates), and the final degree (finalis) of the mode on which the hymn ends.

In current traditional practice, there are more than only one basis in certain mele, and in some particular cases the base degree of the mode is not even the degree of the finalis. The Octoechos cycles as they exist in different chant genres, are no longer defined as entirely diatonic, some of the chromatic or enharmonic mele had replaced the former diatonic ones entirely, so often the pentachord between the finales does no longer exist or the mele of certain kyrioi echoi used in more elaborated genres are transposed to the finalis of its plagios, for instance the papadic melos of echos protos.

Their melodic patterns were created by four generations of teachers at the "New Music School of the Patriarchate" (Constantinople/Istanbul), which redefined the Ottoman tradition of Byzantine chant between 1750 and 1830 and transcribed it into the notation of the New Method since 1814.

Whereas in Gregorian chant a mode referred to the classification of chant according to the local tonaries and the obligatory psalmody, the Byzantine echoi were rather defined by an oral tradition how to do the thesis of the melos, which included melodic patterns like the base degree (ison), open or closed melodic endings or cadences (cadential degrees of the mode), and certain accentuation patterns. These rules or methods defined melopœia, the different ways of creating a certain melos. The melodic patterns were further distinguished according to different chant genres, which traditionally belong to certain types of chant books, often connected with various local traditions.

Melopœia of new exegeseis types
According to the New Method, the whole repertory of hymns used in Orthodox chant, had been divided into four chant genres or exegesis types defined by their tempo and their melodic patterns used for each echos. On the one hand, their names were taken from traditional chant books, on the other hand, different forms, which had never been connected in hymnology, were now put together by a purely musical definition of melos which had been summed up by a very broad concept of more or less elaborated psalmody:
Papadic hymns are melismatic troparia sung during the Divine Liturgy (Cheruvikon, Koinonikon, etc.), according to the New Method slow in tempo, and fast in Teretismoi or Kratemata (sections using abstract syllables); the name "papadic" refers to the treatise of psaltic art called "papadike" (παπαδική) and its elaborated form is based on kalophonic compositions (between the 14th and the 17th century). Hence, also kalophonic compositions over models taken from the sticherarion (so-called stichera kalophonika or anagrammatismoi) or from the heirmologion (heirmoi kalophonikoi) were part of the papadic genre and used its melos (Papadic Octoechos).
Sticheraric hymns are taken from the book sticherarion (στιχηράριον), its text is composed in hexameter, today the Greek chant book is called Doxastarion ("the book of Doxasticha"), according to the New Method there is a slow (Doxastarion argon) and a fast way (Doxastarion syntomon) of singing its melos; the tempo used in syntomon is 2 times faster than that of the papadic melos. Since the old repertory there has been always a distinction between stichera idiomela, stichera with own melodies which are usually sung only once during the year, and stichera avtomela—metrical and melodical models which belong less to the repertory itself, they were rather used to compose several stichera prosomeia, so that these melodies were sung on several occasions. The name Doxastarion derived from the practice to introduce these chants by one or both stichoi of the small doxology. Hence, stichera were also called Doxastika and regarded as a derivative of psalmody, at least according to Chrysanthos of Madytos. But also elaborated psalmody and their torsos like certain troparia as trisagion or the Hesperinos psalm 140.1 κύριε ἐκέκραξα (kekragaria), and the cycle of eleven Doxastika (stichera heothina) of the Matins Gospels represented models of the sticheraric melos.
Heirmologic hymns are taken from the heirmologion (εἱρμολόγιον), their meter is defined by the odes of the canon, their content according to the first 9 biblical odes, in the poetic composition is based on melodic models called "heirmos" (εἱρμός); according to the New Method there is a slow (Katavaseion) and a fast way (Heirmologion syntomon) of singing it; the tempo is up to two times faster than that of the sticheraric melos. The melos follows strict melodic patterns which are also applied to texts sung from the service book the Menaion.
Troparic hymns are taken from the book of the Great Octoechos (Slavonic Oсмогласникъ "Osmoglasnik") and its melos is memorised by the most frequently—several times each day according to the echos of the week—sung resurrection hymns (apolytikia anastasima) and theotokia (troparic hymns dedicated to the Mother of God); according to the Anastasimatarion neon of the New Method the troparic melos has the same tempo than the fast heirmologic melos, but in certain modes different melodic patterns and genus.

This is the distinction as it has been taught in most of the chant manuals today, but at the beginning of the 19th century, Chrysanthos defined the four genres in a slightly different way:
Οἱ δὲ Ἐκκλησιαστικοὶ μουσικοὶ κατὰ τὰ διάφορα εἴδη τῆς ψαλμῳδίας ἔψαλλον καὶ ἔγραφον, ποιοῦτες καὶ ῥυθμοὺς, καθ᾽ οὓς ἐχειρονόμουν, καὶ ἑφευρίσκοντες καὶ μέλη, ἁρμόζοντα τοῖς σκοπουμένοις. Ἐσύνθετον δὲ καὶ θέσεις χαρακτήρων μουσικῶν, ἵνα συνοπτικῶς γράφωσι τὸ ψαλλόμενον, καὶ παραδίδωσι τοῖς μαθηταῖς εὐμεθόδως τὰ πονήματάτων. Ὅτε δὲ καὶ οἱ μαθηταὶ τούτων ἑμελοποίων, ἐμιμοῦτο τὸν τρόπον τῶν διδασκάλων (*). [...] Ταῦτα τὰ εἴδη τῆς ψαλμῳδίας ἀνάγονται εἰς τέσσαρα γένη μελῶν· Στηχηραρικὸν παλαιὸν, Στιχηραρικὸν νέον, Παπαδικὸν, Εἱρμολογικόν.
The church musicians sang and wrote the different forms of psalmody, they created the rhythm, and over those they performed the cheironomies [hand signs] and invented the mele according to their needs. So they composed their theseis of the musical neumes, how to sing the synoptic signs, and by their own examples the students could learn the method and how to follow it. Thus, the students learnt the thesis of the melos, and they imitated their teachers in their own compositions [footnote quoting Manuel Chrysaphes]. [...] These forms of psalmody can be reduced to four kinds of melos: the old sticheraric, the new sticheraric, the papadic, and the heirmologic.
Changes in the chant tradition were justified by a quotation of Manuel Chrysaphes, where he mentioned, that John Koukouzeles made up his own compositions in the kalophonic performance of a sticheron, but he always followed the traditional models "step by step". By using this quotation, Chrysanthos tried to justify the radical innovations by the "New Music School of the Patriarchate" as its teachers' way to integrate the New Method within the tradition of Byzantine chant.

The detailed transcription of the thesis of the melos and its various methods within the medium of the New Method redefined the genres according to parameters like tempo, rhythm, and the melodic treatment of text (between syllabic and highly melismatic). Only later, since the end of the 19th century, treatises were published in Greek by Kosmas, Metropolit of Madytos (1897, vol. 1, pp. 42-69), and in Bulgarian by Peter Sarafov (1912, pp. 90-119). Both editions contained an introduction to teach systematically the formulas of each echos according to its troparic, heirmologic, sticheraric and papadic melos (usually a catalogue of the exposition and the different cadence formulas used in each melos).

The redefinition of each chant genre with an own melos and an own tempo was part of the process, which preceded its first distribution as printed chant books. Parallel to the work of the teachers at the "New Music School of the Patriarchate" which started about the middle of the 18th century, there was a later political process in which the Ottoman Empire was split into several independent nations (between the late 19th and the early 20th century). These nations were declared by a kind of national church, which defined itself as an own Patriarchate which was independent (avtokephalos), in front of the former Patriarchate of Constantinople. For each of this nations the tradition of Orthodox chant had to be redefined and the introduction of printed editions was an important part of it.

But already the definition of four chant genres had to face characteristic conflicts, and they will be described exemplarily by means of the heirmologion and of the sticherarion.

Debates about the sticheraric melos
Chrysanthos already mentioned a traditional and a modern way of performing the sticheraric chant, and continued:

Καὶ τὸ μὲν παλαιὸν στιχηραρικὸν μέλος εἶναι τοιοῦτον, οἷον εὑρίσκεται εἰς τὸ παλαιὸν Ἀναστασιματάριον, εἰς τὰ παλαιὰ στιχηράρια, καὶ εἰς τὸ Δοξαστικάριον Ἰακώβου. Μελίζονται λοιπὸν μὲ στιχηραρικὸν μέλος Δοξαστικὰ, στιχηρὰ, ἀναστάσιμα, αἶνοι, προσόμοια, ἰδιόμελα ἑωθινά.
§. 403. Τὸ δὲ νέον στιχηραρικὸν μέλος εἶναι τοιοῦτον, οἷον εὑρίσκεται εἰς τὸ Ἀναστασιματάριον Πέτρου τοῦ Πελοποννησίου. Μελίζονται λοιπὸν μὲ τοιοῦτον μέλος, Δοξαστικὰ, στιχηρὰ, ἀναστάσιμα, ἐξαποστειλάρια, αἶνοι, προσόμοια, ἰδιόμελα, ἑωθινὰ, καθίσματα, ἀντίφωνα, εἰσοδικά.

The old sticheraric melos is the one found in the old Anastasimatarion [the cycle of 11 stichera heothina in the Anastasimatarion of Panagiotes the New Chrysaphes], in the old Sticheraria, and in the Doxastikarion of Iakovos. Hence, the doxastika, the stichera, the anastasima [elaborate resurrection hymns], the ainoi [Laudate-psalms], the prosomoia and idiomela, and the stichera heothina [see Matins Gospel] are made of the sticheraric melos.
The new sticheraric melos is the one preserved in the Anastasimatarion of Petros Peloponnesios. Hence, the doxastika, the stichera, the anastasima, the exaposteilaria, the ainoi, the prosomoia and idiomela, the stichera heothina, the kathismata and antiphona, and the eisodika are made of this melos.

It is surprising that he did not mention Petros' Doxastarion syntomon, but only his Anastasimatarion, which should not be mistaken with the Anastasimatarion neon, published by Petros Ephesios in 1820. It is not less surprising, that the psalmodic composition of the vesper psalm 140.1 Κύριε ἐκέκραξα (kekragarion) in the Anastasimatarion was listed by Chrysanthos as example of the papadic melos.

Probably Chrysanthos had an earlier plan, before Petros Ephesios realised the first printed editions. There are copied manuscripts of a rather unknown Anastasimatarion syntomon ascribed to Petros Peloponnesios and it was assumed that Gregorios the Protopsaltes transcribed it according to the New Method. This manuscript had a second part as well, which was a Sticherarion including the fixed (μηναῖον) and the moveable cycle (τριῴδιον, πεντηκοστάριον) which did not only contain the stichera prosomeia and the troparia, but also the theotokia, kontakia, and eisodika of the sticherarion. In fact this Anastasimatarion syntomon was created during Petros' lifetime, but not by him, it is usually identified with the name of its publisher Ioannes the Protopsaltes, but it was created by him and Daniel the Protopsaltes, although the latter is not mentioned in a very particular print edition of the Anastasimataria, because it included not only the Petros' Anastasimatarion neon and the stichera heothina, but also the pasapnoaria, the anabathmoi, the heirmologia (katavasion and syntomon), and a certain Anastasimatarion syntomon composed in a melos, which is today called "troparic". The "fast sticheraric melos" represented by "Petros Peloponnesios'" Anastasimatarion syntomon was probably meant as an early name for the "troparic melos". There is another manuscript (Ms. 716 of the National Library of Athens) which contains the transcription of Petros' sticheraric compositions, as they are today part of the printed editions called Anastasimatarion neon which is not mentioned here, since the "old sticheraric melos" was rather represented by the traditionalist Iakovos who opposed to the rhythmic style of Petros' Doxastarion syntomon. The names of the chant genres as a category of the melos and its identification with a certain tempo (once the method of the thesis) were obviously taken from the traditional chant books, but its redefinition was based on a universal concept of psalmody, which was not the reception of Panagiotes the New Chrysaphes' Anthology who once tried to follow the tradition into the footsteps of Manuel Chrysaphes, but the oral hyphos style developed by Ioannes of Trapezountios. The "troparic melos" was the simpler psalmody with respect to the traditional simple psalmody. The New Method created four octoechos cycles—one for each genre, but there was no longer a strong connection between the traditional method to do the thesis of the melos according to the convention of a certain book, and the four octoechos cycles had been as well used to integrate several melodies, which had not been so far regarded as a part of the Octoechos tradition.

Concerning the sticheraric melos as the realisation of the repertory of the old book sticherarion, the strict rhythmic form of the melos, as it had been created by Petros Peloponnesios, had been criticised and refused by Iakovos the Protopsaltes, a teacher of the following generation. It seems that his opinion had a great influence on the fourth generation of teachers, who were responsible for the reform notation and the preparation of the printed edition—especially, because Iakovos' Doxastarion argon was called by Chrysanthos the "old sticheraric method." Nevertheless, the first printed "Doxastarion syntomon" by Petros Peloponnesios and his composition of the Kekragaria, as they had been published in the "Anastasimatarion neon" by Petros Ephesios, suggested the style which became soon the widely accepted example of the "sticheraric melos". Iakovos' Doxastarion argon had rather been transcribed according to the "papadic" Octoechos. For two reasons. First, it was indeed the closest realisation with respect to the models given by the revised 14th-century sticheraria. Second, the different chant genres had not been so strictly separated in those sticheraria, due to the synthesis of all great signs in the Papadike, but also due to a synthesis of the phonic neumes which used the same combinations for the cadences as they were used in the contemporary manuscripts of the heirmologion.

Iakovos like many other Protopsaltes of the Patriarchate left the work of the notator to his students, usually the second Domestikos who had to write down his contributions to the psaltic art into notation. Thus, his performances of the doxastika had been first written down into Late Byzantine neumes by Georgios of Crete. Iakovos criticised the rhythmic style of the Sticherarion, published as "Doxastarion syntomon" by Petros Peloponnesios in order to re-establish a simple sticheraric melos.

Comparative studies found only a few similarities between the models of the 14th-century sticheraria and Petros' realisations. Iakovos' own realisations had been transcribed and published by Chourmouzios the Archivist, on the base of the scripts left by Iakovos' student and Chourmouzios' teacher Georgios of Crete. On the other hand, Iakovos' alternative concept of a "slow sticheraric melos" (μέλος στιχηραρικὸν ἀργὸν) did often not strictly follow the old models, it was rather adapted to the contemporary formulas of the melos—in a style which had been often prolonged the conventional method by the "kalophonic method". Nevertheless, it was meant as an abridgement of what has been taught as the "old sticherarion" since the 17th century.

Until the 1880s, important masters like Konstantinos the Protopsaltes followed Iakovos in his negative attitude to the New Method. He still wrote notated manuscripts and refused categorically the use of modern notation. He disregarded the New Method as a cause of corruption and an obstacle in the path to the Byzantine tradition.

But he arranged a compromise, an argosyntomon version which was not as short as Petros Peloponnesios' compositions and not as long as the realisations published as Iakovos' Doxastarion. In liturgical practice Iakovos' Doxastarion argon must still have proven as too long, but Konstantinos Terzopoulos could demonstrate that Konstantinos' Doxastarion argonsyntomon was not simply an abbreviation of Iakovos' compositions, the vocal range became even wider, so that Konstantinos' versions usually supported certain kalophonic elements, as they had been still present in the style called "sticherarikos argos".

Without any doubt a synoptic analysis which compare different layers of the tradition, can always find interesting parallels to the old models. Hence, it is important not to underestimate the last generations who were still familiar with the papadic school. For psaltes of the current tradition they still provide the key for all layers of the older tradition.  In fact, the biggest collection, which had remained in larger parts unpublished, are Chourmouzios' transcriptions into the reform notation of the New Method. He made two cycles of the "old sticherarion" based on 14th-century sticheraria, 4 volumes based on the 17th-century notation written by Germanos of New Patras, and 5 other volumes based on the transcription of Germanos' contemporary Panagiotes the New Chrysaphes. On this background, even Iakovos' Doxastarion argon had been only slow in comparison with Petros Peloponnesios, the traditional psaltic art had enlarged the stichera to a degree, that an abridgement had become necessary—a project which started with Petros Peloponnesios' teacher Ioannis Trapezountios and his foundation of the "New Music School of the Patriarchate".

On the one hand, it was evident that the oral tradition of the sticheraric method was confused between the conventional and the kalophonic method. Probably the mixture had been also occasionally useful for a flexible practice, because kalophonic techniques like teretismata helped to adapt to the length of the ritual during greater feasts. On the other hand, a skilled protopsaltes who was interested to demonstrate his knowledge of the kalophonic art, could as well integrate kalophonic elements in shorter performances and he was imitated by other even less experienced psaltes, who appreciated the performance.

For these reasons, we find manuscripts of the sticherarion kalophonikon written during the 1780s, which have about 1900 pages just for the fixed cycle of the menaion with ca. 600 different compositions (stichera kalophonika and anagrammatismoi) about 200 models, because usually these models had been divided into two or three more or less open sections. The length of the performance was so expanding, that this book had no practical use for the ceremonies. Hence, only extracts had been published in printed anthologies called mathematarion ("book of exercises", which included as well traditional mathemata like Mega Ison). Already Konstantinos' abbreviation of Iakovos' slow sticheraric melos indicates, that Iakovos' abridged sticheraric compositions had been already too long for a practical use, and in the editions of his students Georgios of Crete and Chourmouzios, they had presumably not been distincted enough from the papadic melos. Chourmouzios' transcription had been printed 6 years before Stephanos the Domestikos' publication of Konstantinos' Doxastarion.

One kolon καὶ τόκῳ ζῶσα πρέσβευε διηνεκῶς·, taken from the eighth section of the Doxastikon oktaechon Θεαρχίῳ νεύματι (Dormition of the Theotokos on 15 August), might illustrate the motivation of the New Method to abbreviate the traditional method of doing the thesis of the sticheraric melos:

This composition, one of three of the sticheraric repertory which pass through all the 8 echoi, had never been a subject of a kalophonic composition, because it could not be subdivided into two or three sections like most of the stichera of the 14th-century sticherarion which did pass through one or two other echoi close to the one indicated by the main signature.

In the eighth section when the melos has arrived the eighth mode (ἦχος πλάγιος τοῦ τετάρτου), the psaltes has to explore the highest possible register of the voice for quite a long time. Already in the edition of the 14th-century sticherarion which had been revised by John Koukouzeles, the cadence at the end of the section dedicated to the echos tritos establishes the plagios cadence not in the lower (υαρ B flat), but in the upper fifth (υαρ c). This transposition (μεταβολή κατὰ τόνον) causes a shift of the ambitus about two pentachords higher, which is the interval of a major ninth, and prepares the melos within the  octave G—d—g with the upper tetrachord (δ' d—α' e—β' f sharp—γ' g).

Today, psaltes are most familiar with the virtuosic salto into the upper octave g in the "fast sticheraric" composition of Petros Peloponnesios. This most abridged version is also the most effective. The voice gets not tired within the upper register, because the singer just jumps only once and for a short moment into the upper tetrachord, so it gives the impression to sing the  one octave higher (in fact, not higher than the upper third). This realisation or exegesis is very convincing, but also the farest one with respect to the model given by the old sticherarion. It clearly illustrates "Hirsiz" Petros' talent as a musician to make up a traditional composition in an individual, but also most convincing way. A psaltis performing his version will easily make the best impression on the audience and this explains, why his version became the most popular one.

In comparison with the model and the other realisations it is evident, that the psaltes usually have to sing in the higher register, starting from the section of echos varys, and that even Iakovos' Doxastarion argon, this most elaborated realisation by Chourmouzios within the New Method which is closest to the traditional realisations in the manuscripts, had been as well composed as an abbreviation of the traditional method, though in opposition of Petros' syntomon-style.

In this kolon already the 14th-century sticherarion had plenty of transpositions. For this reason every example was transcribed by letter notation, as thetic symbols on one line, and by a dynamic symbol according to the papadic parallage on another line (each descending step by a plagios formula, and each ascending one by a kyrios formula). For an easier comparison the thetic symbol is transcribed in a way, that the Doxastikon oktaechon always starts on a κε (α'), even if it has been transcribed a fifth lower as D πα (α') as in some of the printed editions or manuscripts.

Hence, the diatonic  which use the  β' (f sharp), turns now the same into f natural as the  γ'. From here the medial signature πλ δ' at the end of the following kolon on c is prepared, so the thesis of the melos uses here the melos of phthora nana, as it can be found in the final cadence of the transcriptions.

Chourmouzios transcribed the νεάγιε νανὰ cadence transposed a third lower on a (πλ δ'), when he followed the method of Germanos of New Patras (EBE 748), or a second lower on b flat (πλ δ') in his own composition according to the style παλαιὸν (EBE 709), which is still close to his transcription of Germanos. A third exegesis of the old sticheron follows in the footsteps of Panagiotes the New Chrysaphes and his sticherarion according to an horologic order, represented here in a copy by Gerasimos Giannoulatos. This version transposes the nana cadence a tetrachord lower on G (πλ δ'). Already for the traditional method of the sticherarion, the end of the kolon διηνεκῶς· does not fit into the synapsis, because it is composed as a long melisma unlike the three printed versions according to the New Method. This way the kolon of the old sticherarion has been divided into two sections and both end on the same signature and the phthongos of πλ δ', however it has been transposed.

The New Method established since Petros Peloponnesios another more symmetrical subdivision of the kolon with a second cadence at καὶ τόκῳ ζῶσα·, and in Iakovos' and Petros' Doxastarion the voice passes the whole  octave within πρέσβευε, before it finishes the kolon by a  cadence  (δ') on the phthongos d πα'.

Transcription of the heirmologic melos
The transcriptions of the heirmologion kalophonikon were more lucky than those of the sticherarion kalophonikon. They were not only retranscribed according to the New Method by Gregorios the Protopsaltes, but also published by Theodoros Phokaeos as a printed chant book. The printed collections usually favored 17th-century compositions of Petros Bereketis, Balasios Iereas and Germanos of New Patras, but also compositions by Panagiotes Halaçoğlu and teachers of the New Music School, especially by Iakovos the Protopsaltes and his students. The heirmologion kalophonikon usually picked up one ode of the canon and elaborated it in a kalophonic way, but it was divided according to the conventional Octoechos order. A second part (pp. 189-262) was a "Kratematarion of the kalophonic Heirmos" in the Octoechos order as well, which could be used to prolong the performance. Earlier hand-written anthologies usually notated the heirmos kalophonikos together with a certain kratema which had been exclusively composed for it. But the separated form of the printed edition might also indicate that a kratema could be performed alone.

Concerning the discussion of the heirmologic melos between Petros Peloponnesios, Petros Byzantios, and Iakovos the Protopsaltes, there is a very similar evolution, as it can be found in the definition of the sticheraric melos according to the New Method. Petros Peloponnesios composed a "heirmologion ton katavaseion" which has to be performed in the same tempo, as it had become the "fast sticheraric melos". It is a coincidence between the "melos heirmologikon argon" and the "sticherarikon syntomon", as it exists as well between Iakovos' "melos sticherarikon argon" and the "melos papadikes". Petros Peloponnesios' student Petros Byzantios added a simpler version of a "heirmologion syntomon" which followed the same mechanic patterns, as they had been developed by his teacher in his Anastasimatarion syntomon, and his version is today identified as "the heirmologic melos", but its tempo is the same as used for the troparia in the common edition of Anastasimatarion neon.

So we might have four octoechos cycles according to the New Method, which are in the mind of a psaltes in the current tradition of monodic Orthodox Chant, but in fact the "argon" variant in some chant genres tend to cross to the next slower genre.

Iakovos the Protopsaltes refused the rhythmic style of Petros Peloponnesios and his student Petros Byzantios—his colleague and cofounder of the third Music School who created the Heirmologion syntomon, after his teacher had created the Heirmologion argon over the Katavaseion melodies. Soon after Chrysanthos, the enharmonic intonation of the tetrachord was defined as pythagorean, hence, its genos was classified as "hard diatonic".

Innovations

It is not enough to reduce the work of several generations at the "New Music School of the Patriarchate" to a more or less selective translation of "Byzantine Chant", based on a certain redaction of Panagiotes the New Chrysaphes and other Protopsaltes of the 17th century, who tried to save the inherited tradition. Its loss was already anticipated by the Constantinopolitan Lampadarios Manuel Chrysaphes in 1457. Since the fall of Constantinople protopsaltes, including the leading protagonists later at the New Music School, were present as the creators of an own tradition—in the territory of the Ottoman Empire as well as in the Boyar Principalities of Wallachia and Moldavia. It was less opposed to the Byzantine tradition, rather gave it fresh impulses which kept it alive. On the other hand, it shared an equal part with other music traditions in a rich and inspiring exchange among musicians of the Ottoman Empire.

So the question is not only, how they transcribed the traditional repertory into a more or less modified notation, but also, how they used this medium of written transmission for their own compositions within Orthodox chant. During the 17th century Panagiotes the New Chrysaphes and Germanos of New Patras represent more traditional protopsaltes of the Patriarchate, who cared about the proper understanding of the Byzantine tradition, while others like Petros Bereketis had never been directly associated with the Patriarchate, but their psaltic art became very appreciated, because it combined a very refined knowledge of the traditions with experiments of transition that were inspired by their intimate knowledge of makamlar which he had got thanks to a permanent exchange with other musicians. Already Gregorios Bounes Alyates (Γρηγόριος Μπούνης ὁ Ἀλυάτης), Protopsaltes of the Hagia Sophia before and after the conquest of Constantinople, was recognised by the Sultan for the power that he gained over other musicians, because of his competences to write down and to memorize chant from other traditions and to adapt them according to the own Octoechos style. This thief aspect, as it had been discussed by Petros Peloponnesios' career as "Hirsiz Petros", is also connected to the activities, as they had been documented since the 18th century, to transcribe and collect systematically chants from other traditions. This intensive exchange with the music of the Ottoman Empire, which could be occasions or coffee-houses where musicians met together and exchanged their music by performing it, the transcription and memorisation by the medium of Byzantine Octoechos notation, or even music lessons which several Greek musicians asked and got from traditional composers of the whirling dervishes, also inspired certain compositions that they contributed to the traditional genres of Byzantine chant.

The Chrysanthine notation and the New Method, which were also used in the field of "exoteric music" in makam publications like Pandora, Evterpe, Kaliphonos Seiren, and Apanthisma e Mecmue, and the redefinition of the Byzantine tradition adapted to the common tone system of the tambur frets, had been a great temptation to fill the gaps of the four Octoechos cycles with new melodies and intervals which had been imported from other music traditions of the Levantic community of musicians. Makam compositions were not always identified as makam, and especially related genres, like compositions of the heirmologic melos in kalophonic elaboration, rather defined as papadic melos and sung during the Divine Liturgies for instance as koinonikon (while the heirmologion was a traditional part of the daily morning service), became the favorite genre for these experiments. The heirmos kalophonikos was made popular by Petros Bereketis during the 17th century, despite the fact that it already existed since the rise of psaltic art in the last 150 years of the Byzantine Empire.

This genre was also used by composers of the 19th century who wanted to contribute their own compositions to their local tradition, for instance the Macedonian monk Neofit Rilski who was also a chant teacher of the Bulgarian Orthodox Church, and who used a  composition of Petros Bereketis to compose a koinonikon in honor of the patron of the Rila Monastery: Ivan Rilski.

But the innovations did not finish with the foundation of National Orthodox Schools of chant or with the Phanariotes' interest for the transcription of local traditions, of folk or art music. Until today, every Domestikos or Archon psaltis at the Great Church of the Ecumenical Patriarchate is supposed to create his own realisations, in particular for all genres sung during the Divine Liturgies, their cherouvika or their leitourgika—the sung dialogue of the Anaphora composed in a certain echos or even in a certain makam as a particular melos of a certain echos.

The flexibility of psaltic art, for instance to sing the traditional model of the cherouvikon in that length as it is required by a certain ceremony, it does still exist as a standard, at least for the highest rank of the protopsaltes, as far as they do not engage too much in the common fight between the celebrating priest, deacon or hieromonachos and the protopsaltes, while the majority of psaltes depend on the chant as it has been transcribed in the printed chant books of the New Method.

During his period in charge of an archon protopsaltes, Thrasyvoulos Stanitsas notated an abridged week cycle of the cherouvika according to the papadic melos of the Octoechos, because the usual week cycle, based on compositions by Petros Peloponnesios, Gregorios the Protopsaltes, and Chourmouzios the Archivist, was still long enough that performing psaltes had been interrupted quite often. Thrasyvoulos Stanitsas' cycle allows psaltes to perform the cherouvika in even a shorter time without abandoning solistic features like a wide ambitus and frequent changes (μεταβολαὶ) of any kind. He soon added another cycle called "argosyntomon", where the same ideas had been formed out in a rather appropriate way, without being as expansive as the teachers of the New Music School used to be in their compositions of the "argon" cycle for rather festive occasions.

On the other hand, the common attitude of the early 19th century in the long exegesis type called παλαιὸν ("traditional style") has been often perceived as too long, as a kind of ballast or as an obstacle which lies on the way to an easier and more direct understanding of the Byzantine sources. Byzantinists as editors of the Transcripta serial of Monumenta Musicae Byzantinae had always dreamt to make their sources available to performers. During the last years, it was especially Ioannis Arvanitis, like Lykourgos Angelopoulos once student of Simon Karas, who made concrete propositions for performers concerning the thesis of the melos of selected examples taken from medieval chant manuscripts. Following his method of doing the thesis, he re-transcribed from the old notation of Petros Peloponnesios' week cycle.

See also 
Protopsaltes (Domestikos, Lampadarios)—ranks of psaltes in charge of the Patriarchate

People 

Hammamizade İsmail Dede Efendi—composer of the Mevlevi tradition and teacher of Gregorios the Protopsaltes
Iakovos Nafpliotis—Phanariot and head of the Old Patriarchal School

Traditions 
Hagiopolitan and Papadic Octoechos
Byzantine Music—traditional music of the Byzantine Empire
Jewish music—the Sephardic tradition of the Levante
Mevlevi Order—whirling dervishes and their Makam tradition
Music of Greece—various traditions of the islands and the mainland of Greece
Music of Turkey—traditional music since the end of the Ottoman Empire
Ottoman classical music—about all music traditions of the Ottoman Empire

Notes

Sources

Papadikai
.
.

Treatises of the New Method (since 19th century)

Chant books with octoechos notation

Middle Byzantine notation (13th–19th century)

Chrysanthine notation (since 1814)

Studies 

  

.

External links

Recordings
 
 
 

Byzantine music theory
 
Eastern Orthodox liturgical music
Classical and art music traditions
Modes (music)
Ottoman classical music